"" (old-fashioned Italian for "Gigi the lover") is a French song by Dalida first released on a single, with the song "" on the side B, whose lyricists and composers are Michaële, Lana Sebastian and Paul Sebastian. It is one of the singer's biggest international hits with a million records sold worldwide. The disc will be certified gold in Canada as well as platinum in Switzerland. The record company IPG will also give her a platinum disc for sales made in the Benelux.

Charts 
According to the record company, the song would have been number 1 in 9 countries, namely France, Germany, Japan, Spain, Belgium, the Netherlands, French Switzerland, German Switzerland, and Benelux (which actually represents 7 countries).

However, the title would have been No. 1 only in Switzerland, Flanders and Quebec according to the official rankings and would never have reached the Japanese rankings. The song also occupied 2nd place in sales in the Netherlands and Spain, 4th in Wallonia, 10th in France, as well as 13th place in Germany thanks to the ranking of the single "".

Year-end charts

Track listings 
7-inch single Sonopresse IS 45 716 (1974, France)
7-inch single Omega OM 39.058 Y (1974, Belgium)
7-inch single Omega OM 39.058 (1974, Netherlands)
7-inch single Poplandia P-30573 (1974, Spain)
CD single Barclay 9240 (1999, France)
A. "Gigi l'amoroso (Gigi l'amour)" (6:59)
B. "Il venait d'avoir 18 ans" (2:50)
 		 	 
7-inch single Fragola Blu FB 1703 (1974, Italy)
A. "Gigi l'amoroso (Gigi l'amour)" (7:45)
B. "Col tempo" (4:29)
 		 	 
7-inch EP Zip Zip 10.057/E (1974, Portugal)
A. "Gigi l'amoroso (Gigi l'amour)" (6:59)
B1. "Vado via" (3:40)
B2. "Il venait d'avoir 18 ans" (2:50)

Other-language versions 
Belgian band The Strangers recorded it in Dutch as "". Belgian singer Wendy Van Wanten also recorded a Dutch version. Dutch singer Mike Vincent used the melody for a song called "" ("Fries with Mayonnaise"), which was later covered by Johnny Hoes.

Use in torture 
Chilean general Augusto Pinochet reportedly used this song alongside physical torture on his prisoners.

References 

1974 songs
1974 singles
Dalida songs
Song articles with missing songwriters
Barclay (record label) singles